Monilesaurus is a genus of lizards in the draconine clade of the family Agamidae and is a new genus described in 2018.<ref>Monilesaurus. The Reptile Database. www.reptile-database.org.</ref> Currently it consists of 4 species, with 2 new species and 2 species split from the genus Calotes.

Geographic range
The genus Monilesaurus is native to the Western Ghats of India.

Species
Below species were split from Calotes genus:
 Monilesaurus ellioti  – Elliot's forest lizard
 Monilesaurus rouxii  – Roux's forest lizard,  Roux's forest calotes, forest blood sucker

Below species are described newly under this genus:
 Monilesaurus acanthocephalus  – spiny-headed forest lizard
 Monilesaurus montanus''  – montane forest lizard

References

Further reading

External links
 https://biotaxa.org/Zootaxa/article/view/zootaxa.4482.3.1
 https://india.mongabay.com/2018/10/26/photo-feature-meet-the-new-species-of-dragon-lizards-from-the-western-ghats/
 http://novataxa.blogspot.com/2018/09/monilesaurus.html
 https://timesofindia.indiatimes.com/city/nagpur/2-new-species-of-lizards-found-in-western-ghats/articleshow/65986486.cms

 
Lizard genera
Taxa named by Veerappan Deepak